HEIC may refer to:

.heic, filename extension for High Efficiency Image File Format images encoded with High Efficiency Video Coding (HEVC, ITU-T H.265)
HEI-C and HEIC, aliases for CCDC5 protein
Honourable East India Company
Hubble European Space Agency Information Centre